Bonev is a Bulgarian masculine surname, its feminine counterpart is Boneva. It may refer to
Antoaneta Boneva (born 1986), Bulgarian sport shooter
Bogomil Bonev (born 1957), Bulgarian politician 
Deyan Bonev (born 1967), Bulgarian sprint canoer 
Dora Boneva (born 1936), Bulgarian painter
Hristo Bonev (born 1947), Bulgarian football player
Milen Bonev (born 1986), Bulgarian football player
Ventsislav Bonev (born 1980), Bulgarian football player
Zlatko Bonev (born 1994), Bulgarian football player

See also
Bonev Peak in Antarctica

Bulgarian-language surnames